Ophir is an unincorporated community in Curry County, Oregon, United States.  It has a post office with a ZIP code 97464.  Ophir lies at the intersection of Oregon Route 515 and U.S. Route 101, northeast of Nesika Beach.

References

Unincorporated communities in Curry County, Oregon
Unincorporated communities in Oregon
Populated coastal places in Oregon